Buttermilk Falls Natural Area is located in Clyde, Indiana County, Pennsylvania, United States. At , they are one of the highest waterfalls in Pennsylvania.  There is also a short trail to a location behind the falls.

The site is also notable for being the home of Fred McFeely from 1931 to 1956.  Mr. McFeely, from Latrobe, Pennsylvania was the grandfather of Fred Rogers of "Mister Rogers' Neighborhood" on Public Broadcasting Service (PBS) Public television stations.  The stone foundations of their home, stable and swimming area they used as a rural retreat are still visible.

The property is managed by the Indiana County Parks and Trails Department.

Photo Gallery

References

External links
Indiana County Parks Website

Protected areas of Indiana County, Pennsylvania
Waterfalls of Pennsylvania
Landforms of Indiana County, Pennsylvania